Ubiquitin-conjugating enzyme E2 H is a protein that in humans is encoded by the UBE2H gene.

The modification of proteins with ubiquitin is an important cellular mechanism for targeting abnormal or short-lived proteins for degradation. Ubiquitination involves at least three classes of enzymes: ubiquitin-activating enzymes, or E1s, ubiquitin-conjugating enzymes, or E2s, and ubiquitin-protein ligases, or E3s. This gene encodes a member of the E2 ubiquitin-conjugating enzyme family. The encoded protein sequence is 100% identical to the mouse homolog and 98% identical to the frog and zebrafish homologs. Two alternatively spliced transcript variants have been found for this gene and they encode distinct isoforms.

References

Further reading